Groapa may refer to the following places in Romania:

Rivers:
 Groapa, a tributary of the Barcău in Sălaj County
 Groapa, a tributary of the Pleșcoaia in Gorj County
 Groapa Apei, a tributary of the Modicea in Harghita County
 Groapa Copaciului, a tributary of the Timiș in Caraș-Severin County
 Groapa Gomboșoaiei, a tributary of the Lonea in Cluj County
 Groapa Seacă, a tributary of the Jieț in Hunedoara County
 Groapa Pârâului, a tributary of the Ozunca in Covasna County
 Groapa Pietroasă, a tributary of the Aita in Covasna County
 Groapa Pietroasă, a tributary of the Mărcușa in Covasna County

Populated places:
 Groapa Rădăii, a village in the commune Miheșu de Câmpie, Mureș County
 Groapa Tufei, a village in the commune Gura Caliței, Vrancea County
 Groapa Vlădichii, a village in the commune Moara, Suceava County

See also 
 Groapele (disambiguation)
 Izvorul Gropii (disambiguation)